James "Jim" Leo Nelligan (born February 14, 1929) is a former Republican member of the U.S. House of Representatives from Pennsylvania.

Biography
Nelligan was born in Wilkes-Barre, Pennsylvania.  He attended James M. Coughlin High School, graduating in 1946, and King's College in Wilkes-Barre, graduating in 1951. He served in the United States Army, and worked as an accountant. From 1951 to 1967 he was a staff member of the United States General Accounting Office in Washington, D.C.  He also served on the staff for the United States House of Representatives Committee on Government Operations from 1967 to 1970.

He was the director of the Finance and Grants Management Division of the United States Office of Economic Opportunity from 1970 to 1973, and director of the Office of Property Management, Office of Federal Management Policy, United States General Services Administration from 1973 to 1975. He served as operations director for the United States House of Representatives Subcommittee on Oversight and Investigations, Committee on Interstate and Foreign Commerce from 1975 to 1979.

He was elected in 1980 as a Republican to the 97th United States Congress but was an unsuccessful candidate for reelection in 1982.  After his term in Congress he became the Deputy Secretary of Revenue of the Commonwealth of Pennsylvania, from 1983 to 1985.

In 1991, Nelligan ran for a seat on the Luzerne County Board of Commissioners, running on a ticket with incumbent commissioner James Phillips. While Phillips won reelection, Nelligan ultimately lost the election.

References

1929 births
Living people
People from the Scranton–Wilkes-Barre metropolitan area
Politicians from Wilkes-Barre, Pennsylvania
Military personnel from Pennsylvania
United States Army soldiers
King's College (Pennsylvania) alumni
Republican Party members of the United States House of Representatives from Pennsylvania